"Joe's Dream" is a song by English singer and songwriter Natasha Khan, professionally known as Bat for Lashes. It was written and produced by Natasha Khan. The song was released on 7 June 2016 by Parlophone, as the third single from The Bride. A music video, directed by John de Menil and Natasha Khan, was released on 1 September 2016.

Composition

Critical response
The song received very positive reviews.

Music video
A music video for "Joe's Dream" was released on 1 September 2016. It shows Khan wearing a red dress and playing guitar at a wedding chapel.

Track listing 
Digital download
"Joe's Dream" – 5:25

References

2016 singles
Bat for Lashes songs
Parlophone singles
2015 songs
Songs written by Bat for Lashes